La Couarde-sur-Mer (literally La Couarde on Sea) is a commune in the Charente-Maritime department in southwestern France. It is situated on the Île de Ré.

Population

See also
 Communes of the Charente-Maritime department

References

External links
 

Communes of Charente-Maritime
Île de Ré
Charente-Maritime communes articles needing translation from French Wikipedia
Populated coastal places in France